David Allen Vescio (born June 24, 1970) is an American actor and former soldier and photojournalist best known for his villainous roles in film and television. Such as his role in the films Hick, Lost Soul, House of Flesh Mannequins, Air Collision, Gemini Rising and Virus X.

Early life 

When Vescio was young his father was in the army which led him to move twelve times by the time he was 18. He also went to three different elementary schools, two middle schools, and two high schools.  Dave Vescio lived in seven different states by that time of traveling.

Service in the US military 
Vescio served in the US army with the 25th Infantry Division (United States) as an infantryman and was honored for making a citizen's arrest by KNX Newsradio (CBS Radio)

Substance abuse 
While in the military Vescio became a substance abuser of alcohol and illegal drugs. In an interview he stated: "I was mostly dealing LSD, sometimes cocaine, sometimes steroids". He was eventually caught and evaded the police for a year and a half before being arrested in the state of Virginia at the age of 23 and then sentenced to ten years at Fort Leavenworth Maximum security prison.

Filmography

Film

Television

References

External links

Searching for the Truth with Actor Dave Vescio: An Interview at 28dayslateranalysis

Living people
1970 births
American male film actors
United States Army soldiers